Abdul Mannan Syed (3 August 19435 September 2010) was a Bangladeshi poet, and critic. He is known for his considerable research works on Kazi Nazrul Islam, Jibanananda Das, Farrukh Ahmad, Syed Waliullah, Manik Bandyopadhyay, Bishnu De, Samar Sen, Roquiah Sakhawat Hossain, Abdul Ghani Hazari, Muhammad Wajed Ali, Prabodh Chandra Sen. From 2002 to 2004, he had been the executive director of Nazrul Institute.

Life
Syed was born on 3 August 1943 at Basirhat, on the Ichamati River, in 24 Paraganas, in West Bengal of undivided India. In 1946, just before the partition of British Indian, a lethal Hindu-Muslim riot took place and forced many Muslims to leave West Bengal to settle in East Bengal, now Bangladesh.  A less discussed but equally fearsome riot took place in 1950 that drove the family of Syed from West Bengal and to settle in Dhaka of then East Pakistan, now Bangladesh.  He lost his motherland for ever and always felt like a refugee. They first lived in Gopibagh of Dhaka town. Shortly his father bought a piece of land on the Green Road, formerly called Kuli Road. Since then 51 Green Road has been his address until his sudden death in September 2010.

His father Syed A. M. Badruzzdoza was a public official who served in many places of the then East Pakistan.  He was very strict about the formal education of his children. He had six sons and four daughters. Syed was married to his cousin Syra Syed Ranu. His only child was a daughter named Jinan Syed Shampa.
In 1958, Syed passed the Matriculate examination from the Nawabpur High School. In 1960, he passed the Intermediate from the Dhaka College.  He studied Bengali language and literature in the Dhaka University from where he obtained his B. A and M. A.  degrees, respectively, in 1963 and 1964.
Most of his life he earned his livelihood as a teacher of Bengali language and literature in government colleges. He started his career as a lecturer in the M. C. College of Sylhet town.  He also taught in the Sheikh Borhanuddin College in Faridpur. However he served in the Jagannath College for a long time from where he retired in 1998. He also served as the District Gazetteer for a period of time. Later he was appointed the executive director of the Nazrul Institute (2002–2004).

Works 
Syed is best known for his research on Bengali poet Jibanananda Das. Although he is most renowned for literary criticism, he is a versatile writer and poet. He taught as a faculty in the department of Bengali in the Jagannath College, Dhaka. Later he served as Director General of the Nazrul Institute. He was the first Scholar-in-residence in Bangladesh at North South University. For a long time he was associated with the Shilpataru, a monthly literary magazine published from Dhaka by poet Abid Azad.

Death
He had been suffering from diabetes and cardiac troubles for a long time.  On 27 August 2010, he fell sick while participating in an event of Channel I. On 5 September 2010, he was having an afternoon sleep when he suffered a massive cardiac arrest and succumbed to death just before Iftaar. On the following day he was buried at the Azimpur Graveyaed after three Salatul Janazas at Green Road Jam-e-Masjid, Bangla Academy and Dhaka University mosque. His death was widely mourned across the country. All national dailies carried obituary on the following day. Next Friday, all dailies carried in the literary essays on his life and works. Electronic media also featured his death in a befitting manner.

Works

Books of poetry
 Janmandho Kobita Guchcha (1967)
 Jyōtsnā raudrēra cikitsā জ্যোত্স্না রৌদ্রের চিকিত্সা [Moonlight, Treatment for the Sun] (1969)
 Matal Manchitro (1970)
 O Shongbedon O Joltorongo (1974)
 Selected Poems (1975) ( Muktodhara publication)
 Kobita Company Pvt Ltd. (1982)
 Porabastab Kobita (1982)
 Park Street e Ek Ratri (1983)
 Mach Series (1984)
 Amar Sonnet (1990)
 Shokal Proshongsha Tamar (1993)
 Nirobota Govirota Dui Bon Bole Kotha (1997)
 Selected Poems (2001)(Shomoy publication)
 Kobita Shomaggro (2001)
 Kobitar Boi (2006)
 He Bondhur Bondhu He Priyotomo (2006)
 Premer Kobita (2007)
 Matal Kobita Pagal goddya (2008)
 Ogghraner Nil Din (2008)

Novels
Poriprekshiter Dasdasi (Slaves of Perspectives, 1974)
Kolkata (1980)
Poramatir Kaj  (Terracotta, 1982)
A-Te Ajgor  (A for Ajogor, 1982)
He Songsar He Lota (Oh the World, Oh the Creeper, 1982)
Gavir Gavirtara Asukh (Disease, Deep and Deeper, 1983)
Prabesh  (Entrance, 1994)
Kshuda Prem Agun  (Hunger Love Fire, 1994)
Shyamali Tomar Mukh (Shyamali Your Face, 1997)

Short stories
 Shotter moto bodmash (1968)
 Cholo jai porokkhe (1973)
 Mrittur odhik lal khudha (1977)
 Nirbachito golpo (1987)
 Utshob (1988)
 Nekre hayna ar tin pori (1997)
 Mach mangsho matshorjer rupkotha (2001)
 Nirbachito golpo (2002)
 Golpo (2004)
 Sreshtho golpo (2007)

Editorial works
 Life on Distant Shores, written by Abdur Rouf Choudhury, Bengali novel, published by Pathak Samabesh, Dhaka, 2003
 New Horizon, written by Abdur Rouf Choudhury, Bengali novel, published by Pathak Samabesh, Dhaka, 2005.
 Bangladesher Chhara, jointly edited with Shahabuddin Nagari and Abid Azad by Shilpatoru Prakashani, Dhaka, 1987.
 Bagladesher Kabita, jointly edited with Shahabuddin Nagari and Abid Azad by Shilpatoru Prakashani, Dhaka, 1987.

Awards
 Bangla Academy Literary Award (1981)
 Alaol Literary Award (1981)
 Kabi Jasimuddin Award
 Chattagram Sangskriti Kendro Farrukh Memorial Award (1991)

References

Further reading

External links

Three poems by Abdul Mannan Syed in English translation
An article in Daily Jugantor by Shahabuddin Nagari

Bangladeshi male writers
Bengali writers
Academic staff of Jagannath University
1943 births
2010 deaths
Recipients of Bangla Academy Award
Burials at Azimpur Graveyard
Recipients of the Ekushey Padak